Dunvegan was a provincial electoral district in Alberta, Canada, mandated to return a single member to the Legislative Assembly of Alberta using the first past the post method of voting from 1959 to 1971, and again from 1986 to 2004.

The seat for Dunvegan in the Leglislative Assembly was held by the governing party for every year it existed. The riding was named for the small community of Dunvegan, once home to a fur trade post, and now the site of a provincial park and historic site.

History

Boundary history
The first riding named Dunvegan was created out of the western half of Peace River in 1959. It was bounded on the south by the Peace River and extended north to the Northwest Territories border, containing the entire northwest corner of Alberta. When it was abolished in 1971, the north section of the riding was transferred back to Peace River, and the southern two-thirds of the riding, along with the northern half of Spirit River, became Spirit River-Fairview.

In 1986 Dunvegan was re-created, replacing all of Spirit River-Fairview and a small part of Smoky River. In 1993 it absorbed another part of Smoky River (including the community of Falher) as well as a small part of Peace River (including Grimshaw).

The Dunvegan electoral district was dissolved in the 2003 electoral boundary re-distribution, and replaced by the Dunvegan-Central Peace electoral district for the 2004 Alberta general election with no changes to the district's boundaries.

Representation history

The first MLA for Dunvegan was Joseph Scruggs, who narrowly picked the riding up for the governing Social Credit. He did not run for re-election in 1963, but Ernest Lee held the riding for the government for two more terms.

The riding was then replaced by Spirit River-Fairview, which was picked up by New Democrat leader Grant Notley, who held that riding almost until it was replaced by Dunvegan in 1986.

In that election, the governing Progressive Conservatives would win the riding for the first time, despite an NDP surge elsewhere in the province. MLA Glen Clegg represented the area for five terms, retiring in 2001.

PC candidate Hector Goudreau would hold the riding for the government in its final term, and went on to represent Dunvegan-Central Peace for both terms it existed, as well as Dunvegan-Central Peace-Notley until 2015.

Election results

1950s

1960s

1980s

1990s

2000s

See also
List of Alberta provincial electoral districts
Dunvegan, Alberta an unincorporated community within the Municipal District of Fairview No. 136 in northern Alberta, Canada.

References

Further reading

External links
Elections Alberta
The Legislative Assembly of Alberta

Former provincial electoral districts of Alberta